Złotopole  is a village in the administrative district of Gmina Lipno, within Lipno County, Kuyavian-Pomeranian Voivodeship, in north-central Poland. As of 2011 its population is 92. 52.2% of the population is male while 47.8% is female.

References

Villages in Lipno County